The Monal Group of Companies started operations from Lahore back in the early 2000s when the founder Luqman Ali Afzal started his first venture by developing a student convenient store at Lahore University of Management Sciences and started the F1 Trax at Saint Mary's park, Kalma Chowk, Lahore. Luqman Ali Afzal was awarded the prestigious Pride of Performance award by the President of Pakistan for his contributions to the service industry. The total strength of the group stands at more than 3200 employees and runs a chain of restaurants in Islamabad, Lahore and Peshawar.

Beginning
The Monal group started its operations in Islamabad in 2006 with its pilot project 'The Monal'. The building was constructed by the Capital Development Authority (Islamabad) and leased to the group for 15 years. The Monal currently employees 600 people from the surrounding villages of Pir Sohawa, Gokina, Talhar and Sangra.

Controversy
The Monal has been a highlight by the courts and government time and again. Where most recently it was shut down by the Islamabad high court and handed over to CDA/Islamabad Wildlife Management Board on the 11th of January,2022 but the order was later suspended by the Supreme Court of Pakistan on 8 March 2022.

Other verticals
The Monal group also runs a chain of Asian restaurants by the brand name Asian Wok in Islamabad and Peshawar. The company has a portfolio of catering and event management along with three marquees. The company operates an amusement park since 2007 by the name of M1 traxx.

References

Companies of Pakistan